Little Clacton is a village and civil parish in the Tendring district, in the county of Essex, England. It is located on the Tendring Peninsula, close to Clacton-on-Sea. The population of the parish at the 2011 census was 2,822.

The village is approximately 12 miles South East of Colchester and 2.5 miles North of Clacton-on-Sea, and is also close to Thorpe-le-Soken where there is a railway station providing direct links to London Liverpool Street station and Clacton-on-Sea.

The parish church is an early twelfth century Norman church building dedicated to St James. It has three bells in its tower, including one cast by Robert Crouch and dating from 1437.

Governance
Little Clacton forms part of the electoral ward called Little Clacton and Weeley. The population of this ward at the 2011 census was 4,590.

Local towns and villages 
Weeley,
Weeley Heath,
Thorpe-le-Soken,
Frinton-on-Sea,
Great Holland,
Clacton-on-Sea,
Jaywick,
Kirby-le-Soken.

References

External links

 Little Clacton Parish Council

Villages in Essex
Civil parishes in Essex
Tendring